The 2013 Atlantic Sun Conference men's soccer season will be the 35th season of men's varsity soccer in the conference. It will be the last A-Sun season for East Tennessee State and Mercer, both of which will move to the Southern Conference in July 2014.

The defending regular season and tournament champions are the Florida Gulf Coast Eagles.

Teams

Stadia and locations

Personnel

Standings

A-Sun Tournament 

The format for the 2013 Atlantic Sun Conference Men's Soccer Tournament will be announced in the Fall of 2013.

Results

See also 

 Atlantic Sun Conference
 2013 Atlantic Sun Conference Men's Soccer Tournament
 2013 NCAA Division I men's soccer season
 2013 in American soccer

References 

 
2013 NCAA Division I men's soccer season